The men's discus throw event at the 2016 IAAF World U20 Championships was held in Bydgoszcz, Poland, at Zdzisław Krzyszkowiak Stadium on 24 July.  A 1.75 kg (junior implement) discus was used.

Medalists

Results

Final
24 July

Qualifications
24 July
With qualifying standard of 59.00 (Q) or at least the 12 best performers (q) advance to the Final

Summary

References

Discus throw
Discus throw at the World Athletics U20 Championships